Postelle is an unincorporated community in Hicksville Township, Phillips County, Arkansas, United States. The community has access to the Arkansas Highway System via Arkansas Highway 39S.

References

Unincorporated communities in Phillips County, Arkansas
Unincorporated communities in Arkansas